Wicked is the second studio album by Anglo–American singer Sinitta. It was released in 1989. It was less successful than her 1987 self-titled debut, but included the hit single "Right Back Where We Started From" which reached number 4 in the UK and was her only charting hit in her native US, peaking at number 84 on Billboard's Hot 100 Chart.

Album information
Following the release of her debut album Sinitta! in 1987 Sinitta moved away from working directly with Stock Aitken Waterman although she continued to record at PWL under the direction of Pete Hammond, Phil Harding and Ian Curnow. Her second album, Wicked released in 1989 contained only one SAW track- "I Don't Believe in Miracles", two other tracks recorded with SAW in the same sessions "How Can This Be Real Love" and "Do You Wanna Find Out?" were ultimately shelved. The remaining tracks were produced by the aforementioned Hammond, Harding & Curnow in addition to Nigel Wright and German producer Ralf-René Maué (London Boys).

"Wicked" was a minor success on the charts. It missed the Top 40 in the United Kingdom and peaked at number 52. The album's second single "Right Back Where We Started From" became Sinitta's only charting single in her native US, peaking at number 84 on Billboard's Hot 100 Chart in 1989.

Track listing

1989 edition

 Tracks 7, 14 and 15 are CD-only bonus tracks.

Charts

References

1989 albums
Albums produced by Stock Aitken Waterman
Sinitta albums